Larry Douglas Kump (born January 27, 1948, in Chambersburg, Pennsylvania) is an American politician who served as a member of the West Virginia House of Delegates from 2010 to 2014 and again from 2018 to 2020.

Early life and education
Kump was born in Chambersburg, Pennsylvania. He earned an associate degree from Hagerstown Community College and a Bachelor of Science degree in political science from Frostburg State University.

Career
In 2010, when Representative Craig Blair ran for the West Virginia Senate and left his seat open, Kump was unopposed for the May 11, 2010, Republican primary, winning with 728 votes, and won the November 2, 2010, General election with 3,735 votes (57.1%) against Democratic nominee Michael Roberts, who had run for the seat in 2008.

In 2012, Kump was redistricted to the 59th district.

In 2014, Kump lost the primary to Saira Blair by a vote of 54.5 percent to 45.5 percent. Kump said that he was not surprised he lost, citing his independent voting record and the desire of the district's Republicans to be represented by a Delegate who would conform better to the party line.

In the 2016 election, Kump ran for the 15th District seat in the West Virginia Senate, held by fellow Republican Craig Blair. Kump was defeated by 9,823 votes (67.77%) to 4,671 (32.23%).

In the 2018 election, Kump ran for the 59th District seat in the West Virginia House of Delegates, defeating Democrat John Isner by a vote of 62.0 percent to 38.0 percent. Kump was defeated for reelection in the 2020 Republican primary by Ken Reed, 57.32% to 42.68%.

Kump won the 2022 Republican primary for House Of Delegates in the 94th District with two-thirds of the vote in a three-person race. He is unopposed in the general election.

References

External links
Campaign site

Larry D. Kump at Ballotpedia
Larry D. Kump at the National Institute on Money in State Politics

1948 births
Living people
Frostburg State University alumni
Republican Party members of the West Virginia House of Delegates
People from Berkeley County, West Virginia
People from Chambersburg, Pennsylvania
21st-century American politicians